Oldřich Sedlák (3 November 1922 – 4 September 1985) was a Czech ice hockey player who competed in the 1952 Winter Olympics.

References

External links

1922 births
1985 deaths
Czech ice hockey forwards
Olympic ice hockey players of Czechoslovakia
Ice hockey players at the 1952 Winter Olympics
Ice hockey people from Brno
Czechoslovak ice hockey forwards